Aaron Myers (born 1997) is an Irish hurler who plays for Cork Senior Championship club Sarsfields. He is a former member of the Cork senior hurling team. Myers usually lines out as a right corner-forward.

Honours

Sarsfields
East Cork Junior A Hurling Championship: 2016
Cork Premier Under-21 A Hurling Championship: 2017
Cork Minor Hurling Championship: 2014

Cork
Munster Under-21 Hurling Championship: 2018

References

External links
2018 Cork Under-21 Hurling team player profiles at the Cork GAA website

1997 births
Living people
Sarsfields (Cork) hurlers
Cork inter-county hurlers
Hurling forwards
Universiade medalists in rugby sevens
Universiade bronze medalists for Great Britain
Medalists at the 2013 Summer Universiade